The FINA Swimming World Cup is an international series of short course swimming meets organized by FINA, the International Federation for swimming. Launched in 1988, the FINA Swimming World Cup gathers world-class swimmers in a series of two-day meets organised between August and November each year. Across nine locations, the circuit is structured in clusters (Middle East, Europe and Asia) and distributes a total of prize money reaching US$2.5 million.

Currently, the overall first, second, and third-place winners are awarded prize money. The men's and women's series winners take home $150,000 each, runners-up $100,000, and third-place finishers $50,000, following a prize-money increase announced by FINA in September 2017.

Events
The events are the same for all meets, but the competition order may vary. The meets are held over two days, with preliminary heats in the morning, and finals in the evening. A noted exception to this style are the meets held in Brazil, where prelims have been in the evening with finals the following morning (and hence a three-day format).

On most years, the races are held in short course pools; the exception recently being the season leading up to an Olympic year, where events are swum in long course venues.

Current series events (all in short course pools):
Freestyle: 50, 100, 200, 400, 800 (women only) and 1500 (men only)
Backstroke: 50, 100 and 200
Breaststroke: 50, 100 and 200
Butterfly: 50, 100 and 200
Individual Medley: 100, 200, and 400
Relays: 4 × 50 m mixed freestyle, 4 × 50 m mixed medley, 4 × 100 m mixed freestyle, 4 × 100 m mixed medley

Winners

Most wins

Active swimmers*
r = relays

Medals table (1988-2016)

 Some silver and bronze medals since 1988 to 1993 are missing.

Venues

References

External links

 
Recurring sporting events established in 1988
Swimming World Cup
International swimming competitions
Swimming